The 2003 National Camogie League is a competition in the women's team field sport of camogie was won by Cork, who defeated Tipperary in the final, played at Páirc Uí Rinn.

Arrangements
Tipperary defeated Antrim and Dublin, and had a walkover from Derry and defeated Kilkenny to reach the final. Cork had a tougher draw, but defeated Galway, Wexford, Limerick and Kilkenny.

The Final
The teams were level on six occasions during the final. Cork’s superior fitness won the final with a late quartet of points. Fiona O'Driscoll contributed a personal total of 2-5. Tipperary did not have a single wide during the hour. Cork had five, four of them in the first half. Tipperary reversed the result in the All-Ireland final, the third time they had done so in a four-year period.

Division 2
The Junior National League, known since 2006 as Division Two, was won by Galway who defeated Armagh in the final.

Final stages

References

External links
 Camogie Association

National Camogie League
2003